2014–15 Duleep Trophy was the 54th season of the Duleep Trophy, a first-class cricket tournament contested by 5 zonal teams of India: Central Zone, East Zone, North Zone, South Zone and West Zone. Central Zone won the tournament after beating South Zone by 9 runs in the final at Delhi.

Schedule
The 2014–15 Duleep Trophy consisted of four matches played between the teams, where the two teams that performed the worst in the 2013–14 season of the Duleep Trophy, East Zone and West Zone, had to play each other in an additional knockout game to progress to the semifinals.

The schedule:
 15–18 October - Quarterfinal - East Zone vs West Zone
 22–25 October - Semifinal1 - Central Zone vs North Zone
 22–25 October - Semifinal2 - South Zone vs Winner Quarterfinal
 29 October-2 November - Final - Winner Semifinal1 vs Winner Semifinal2

Squads

Results

Quarterfinal

Semifinal 1

Semifinal 2

Final

References

External links
Cricinfo page

Duleep Trophy
Duleep Trophy